The Salmon Run Bell Tower is a bell tower and glockenspiel in Vancouver, Washington's Esther Short Park, in the United States.

Description
The tower is in Propstra Square, the southeast corner of Esther Short Park, near the intersection of 6th and Columbia Street. The  tower was designed by architect Cindy Sterry, and features a clock by the Verdin Bells & Clock Company and glockenspiel diorama which tells a story about the Chinookan peoples. The tower also features the art installation Spiraling Salmon by Jim Demetro, who also designed the nearby statue of George Vancouver (2000). The installation features bronze sculptures of salmon.

History
Funded by philanthropist George Propstra and donations by other local businessmen, the tower was dedicated in 2002. Propstra contributed $3 million.

See also
 The Pioneer Mother Memorial, also installed in Esther Short Park

References

External links

 , The Columbian (October 2, 2018)

2002 establishments in Washington (state)
Bell towers in the United States
Bronze sculptures in Washington (state)
Buildings and structures completed in 2002
Buildings and structures in Vancouver, Washington
Clock towers in Washington (state)
Fish in art
Outdoor sculptures in Washington (state)